iGen is a Java benchmarking suite by Sun Microsystems.

iGen or Igen may also refer to:
Yakusan Igen (745–827), Zen Buddhist monk
iGen, a term for the demographic cohort Generation Z

See also